Nicholas Caradoc Hoult (born 7 December 1989) is an English actor. His filmography includes supporting work in big-budget mainstream productions and starring roles in independent projects in the American and the British film industries. He has received several accolades, including nominations for a British Academy Film Award, two Golden Globe Awards, and a Primetime Emmy Award. He was included in the 2012 edition of Forbes 30 Under 30.

Hoult performed in local theatre productions as a child. He made his screen debut at age seven in the 1996 film Intimate Relations, and appeared in several television programmes between 1998 and 2001. His breakthrough came with the 2002 comedy-drama About a Boy. He achieved wider recognition for his performance as Tony Stonem in the E4 teen series Skins (2007–2008). His transition to adult roles began with the 2009 drama film A Single Man, for which he earned a BAFTA Rising Star Award nomination, and the fantasy film Clash of the Titans (2010). He played the mutant Hank McCoy in the 2011 superhero film X-Men: First Class, a role he reprised in later instalments of the series.

Hoult starred as a zombie in the romantic comedy Warm Bodies (2013), and had a supporting role in 2015's Mad Max: Fury Road. He starred in a number of independent films before portraying various historical figures such as Robert Harley in the black comedy The Favourite (2018), writer J. R. R. Tolkien in Tolkien (2019), and Peter III in the Hulu comedy-drama series The Great (2020–present). His work in The Great earned him nominations for two Golden Globes and an Emmy Award. He has since starred in the black comedy The Menu (2022).

Outside of film, Hoult voiced Elliot in Lionhead Studios' 2010 action role-playing game Fable III, appeared in the 2009 West End play New Boy, and supports the charitable organisations Teenage Cancer Trust and Christian Aid.

Early life
Nicholas Caradoc Hoult was born on 7 December 1989 in Wokingham, Berkshire, to Glenis (née Brown), a piano teacher, and Roger Hoult, a commercial pilot. His middle name, Caradoc (pronounced /ka.ˈrɑː.dɔk/), is Welsh and translates to "The Beloved One". His paternal grand-aunt was Dame Anna Neagle, a stage and film actress active in the 1930s and 1940s. He has three siblings: an elder brother who is a United States–based biology student; and two sisters, both of whom are actresses. Hoult spent most of his childhood at his family's residence in Sindlesham, an estate village in the borough of Wokingham. His older siblings were interested in acting and dancing from an early age, taking classes and attending auditions. As a child, he began accompanying them and developed his own interest in acting. He discussed his childhood and his relationship with his siblings in a 2011 interview with The Guardian saying, "[we were] pretty outdoorsy normal kids running around in the garden and making tree houses ... it was very normal".

During Hoult's childhood, his father was regularly working away from home and his brother was away attending school. As a result, he spent most of his time with his mother and sisters; he said being raised by women might have helped him "steer clear of some pitfalls that guys who didn't grow up with women would fall into". Hoult was educated at The Coombes Infant and Nursery School and then Arborfield Church of England Junior School. He practised ballet with his sisters and took part in productions of Swan Lake and The Nutcracker with the English National Ballet. Although he initially wanted to attain advanced level certificates in English, Biology, and Psychology, in 2002, aged 12, he decided instead to attend acting school at Sylvia Young Theatre School. At age 14, he left to attend the Church of England's secondary school Ranelagh School in Bracknell, Berkshire. Hoult played trombone as a child and was a member of the local choir.

Career

1996–2005: Early career
Hoult's acting potential was discovered at age three by a theatre director during a performance of a play that starred Hoult's brother. The director was impressed at Hoult's ability to "concentrate well" and offered him a role in his next theatre production The Caucasian Chalk Circle. Hoult began attending auditions and at age five was cast in the 1996 drama Intimate Relations, his first feature-film role. He later appeared in the television programmes Casualty, Silent Witness, The Bill, Judge John Deed, and Doctors, among others. Hoult initially treated acting as a hobby rather than a potential career option; in a March 2009 interview with The Daily Telegraph, he said he was not "in love with it ... I just enjoyed it. It was like playing for a football team. When you got a part it was great. And meeting new people. It was an exciting new world."

Hoult's next feature-film appearance came at age eleven in Chris and Paul Weitz's 2002 comedy-drama film About a Boy. Hoult was initially reluctant to audition for the role as the casting process was a lengthy one and interfered with his schooling. He nonetheless decided to participate in the early rounds of auditions and was eventually cast in the role of Marcus, a "woolly-hatted, oddball son of a suicidal, hippy-ish single mother, [who] gets bullied horribly at school". About a Boy was a commercial success, grossing more than $130million worldwide and receiving praise by film critics. Hoult's portrayal of a lonely schoolboy was well-received; David Thomas, writing for The Daily Telegraph, attributed the film's appeal and success to Hoult's performance. By the time the film was released, Hoult had left his junior school in Arborfield and began attending Sylvia Young Theatre School in London. He said the change was difficult; his time there was short and he preferred attending a regular school. He still did not want to pursue acting as a profession and at 14 he left Sylvia Young Theatre School in favour of Ranelagh School.

Hoult starred in Richard E. Grant's semi-autobiographical film Wah-Wah (2005) as Ralph Compton, a boy who is forced to deal with the disintegration of his family. The film, set in Swaziland during the 1960s, chronicles the waning years of the Swaziland Protectorate. Hoult made his debut in Hollywood with Gore Verbinski's film The Weather Man (2005) as the son of a television weather presenter undergoing a mid-life crisis. The film and Hoult's performance went largely unnoticed. Both Wah-Wah and The Weather Man performed poorly at the box office.

2006–2010: Skins and West End debut
Hoult was a student at Sixth Form College Farnborough in 2006 when he was cast in the lead role of the television teenage-drama Skins. He was initially sceptical of his ability to play Tony Stonem, a manipulative, egocentric anti-hero, and identified more closely with the supporting character Sid. The programme was a success and ran for seven series, only two of which Hoult appeared in. His performance was well received; the character was popular, and Hoult garnered widespread attention. Skins won the British Academy of Film and Television Arts (BAFTA) Philip Audience Award, and Hoult was nominated for the Golden Nymph Award for Best Actor in a Drama Series. Critic Elliott David lauded Hoult for his performance in a 2016 retrospective review, and wrote that he "maintain[ed] the inexplicable core of his character throughout". During his time on Skins, Hoult felt overwhelmed by the attention he received and considered quitting acting altogether at one point. Instead, he left school at the end of Skins first series and chose to focus solely on acting.

Hoult briefly appeared as Stefan Fredman in the pilot episode of the British television series Wallander. He later made his West End theatre debut as Mark, the protagonist in William Sutcliffe's coming-of-age play New Boy; the production premiered at Trafalgar Studios and had record-breaking ticket sales, which was mostly attributed to Hoult's popularity among viewers of Skins. The play was staged for a week in March 2009 because Hoult had committed to a part in the fantasy-adventure film Clash of the Titans (2010), filming for which was scheduled for mid-2010. Hoult's performance as Mark, a "ferociously bright and articulate but sexually confused sixth-former" received mixed responses from critics. Dominic Cavendish of The Daily Telegraph wrote that his performance was persuasive, but Lyn Gardner of The Guardian found him average and highlighted his inability to bring out the "unresolved sexual tension beneath [the] banter". Clash of the Titans was panned by critics but was a success at the box office, grossing nearly $500,000,000 worldwide.

Hoult next appeared in Tom Ford's A Single Man (2009), after the actor originally cast in the role of Kenny Potter left the film a few days before filming commenced. Hoult had previously shown interest in the project and had sent a recorded audition tape; he was eventually chosen for the role of Kenny, a homosexual college student who helps a college professor deal with his grief. A Single Man was variously described by media outlets as the first adult role for Hoult, who described Kenny as a "spontaneous" character not simply defined by his sexuality. Because the role was his first as an American character, Hoult worked on his accent; Sukhdev Sandhu of The Daily Telegraph noted Ford's choice of casting British actors as Americans (Hoult and Matthew Goode) and vice versa (Julianne Moore). A Single Man opened to widespread acclaim despite reservations from critics about Ford's directorial abilities; it was a box-office success. The film earned Hoult a nomination for the BAFTA Rising Star Award at the 2010 ceremony. In 2010, Hoult voiced the character of Elliot in Lionhead Studios' action role-playing game Fable III (2010).

2011–2016: Commercial success with X-Men and Mad Max
Hoult was cast as Nux in George Miller's action film Mad Max: Fury Road; the project spent several years in development hell because plans for a fourth film in the Mad Max franchise encountered financial difficulties. Filming was planned for mid-2010, but heavy rain caused severe delays during pre-production in Australia. With no other immediate commitments, Hoult began to look for other prospects. He was eventually cast in the role of Hank McCoy / Beast for the X-Men film series owing to his ability to play somebody "gentle with a capability of being fierce". Before filming began on the 2011 Matthew Vaughn-directed instalment X-Men: First Class, a prequel to the franchise's earlier films, Hoult familiarised himself with his character; he said he "formulated [his] own version of the Beast" and took inspiration from Kelsey Grammer's performance in the previous X-Men: The Last Stand because he wanted to emulate Grammer's charm and eloquence. Hoult learned to speak in a dialect similar to Grammer's without trying to imitate it. He also underwent physical training and gained weight to better suit his character. The film, which was widely praised by critics for its script and performances, performed moderately well at the box office, collecting about $353million against a production budget of $160million. Although it was the lowest-ranked production in the entire series in terms of revenue, Chris Aronson of 20th Century Fox deemed it "an excellent start to a new chapter of the franchise".

Mad Max: Fury Road was eventually filmed in 2012 in the Namibian desert. Miller had conceived Nux, a terminally ill slave, as a "quasi kamikaze pilot"; Hoult said of his character; "he's very enthusiastic and committed and affectionate but also kind of clumsy". Hoult shaved his head and followed a strict diet because his role required him to lose a lot of weight. He also talked about performing stunts in the film, describing the entire experience as "scary", but favourably compared the stunt crew and Miller's choice to incorporate real action sequences instead of using a green screen, saying it made the performance more believable because the actors are placed in a real situation. Fury Road opened to critical acclaim on 14 May 2015 and grossed more than $378million worldwide, making it the highest-grossing film in the Mad Max franchise. The technical aspects and stunt sequences drew particular praise from film critics and it was credited for reviving interest in the series. Shalini Langer noted that while the real hero of the film was Charlize Theron, "[Hoult] is the closest in the acting department ... as Joe's 'war boy' chasing imagined glory". Hoult's "fabulously unhinged" performance was also praised by Robbie Collin of The Daily Telegraph. Also in 2012, Hoult was included in the Forbes 30 under 30 list.

In 2013, Hoult had starring roles in two major films; he first played a zombie named R in Jonathan Levine's romantic comedy Warm Bodies, which was released on 1 February. An adaptation of Isaac Marion's novel of the same name, the film is presented from point of view of the central character, mostly through narration. Levine said he had difficulties finding a suitable actor to play R until he met Hoult, who was attracted to the project—which he described as "much more than a horror movie" owing to the use of multiple pop culture and literary allusions—and even more so to the role which "bowled [me] over". Hoult said he drew inspiration from Edward Scissorhands (1990) because he thought the central characters in both films share the same difficulties. To prepare for the role of a zombie, Hoult and the other actors practised with Cirque du Soleil performers; he said of the experience; "we would take our shoes off in a dance studio ... kind of grow out of the wall and make our bodies feel very heavy". The film garnered positive response from critics and audiences. Ben Kendrick praised Hoult for the restraint in a potentially Razzie-worthy role: "[he] brings a lot of life to R without stepping too far in the other direction [and although his] zombie mannerisms may come across a bit forced but, overall, his memorable moments outnumber (and outweigh) the awkward ones." Hoult was also described as "an extremely appealing actor, [who] is charm personified" in his role of the living-dead.

Hoult's next film, Bryan Singer's 2013 fantasy adventure Jack the Giant Slayer, failed at the box office and received mixed response from critics. He played the eponymous hero in the film, which is based on the British fairy tales "Jack the Giant Killer" and "Jack and the Beanstalk". Hoult's performance was poorly received by film critics Mary Pols, Justin Chang and Richard Roeper; Pols was critical of his "disconcerting" imitation of Hugh Grant and the other two dismissed him and his character as "bland" and "boring", respectively.

Hoult then appeared in Jake Paltrow's science-fiction film Young Ones (2014). Set in a dystopian future where water is scarce, the film had Hoult play Flem Lever, a young man who is trying to claim the land owned by the film's central character Ernest Holm. Hoult thought the role was unlike any of his previous work and said his character's questionable choices throughout the film intrigued him. Hoult read novels written by S. E. Hinton to prepare for the role. The film was shot in a deserted location in South Africa; Hoult said filming in the hot weather conditions was difficult but the "beautiful" scenery helped to tell the story better. He said it also made him more conscious of environmental concerns. The film premiered at the 2014 Sundance Film Festival and was met with mixed responses. Commentators highlighted the film's standout scenery but were critical of its plot. Keith Uhlich of The A.V. Club said Hoult was a poor fit for the story's "stoically retrograde machismo".

Hoult reprised his role as Beast in Bryan Singer's X-Men: Days of Future Past, his other release of 2014. Hoult said playing the character was a freeing experience for him and that it was "fun to suddenly be able to break loose ... when you're wearing the makeup ... you can perform big ... you get to have two very different techniques, performances." He also said the lengthy make-up procedure could last up to three and a half hours. X-Men: Days of Future Past earned more than $747million worldwide, making it the highest-grossing film in the series and in Hoult's career at that time.

In 2015, Hoult had three other releasesthe feature film adaptation of Gillian Flynn's mystery novel Dark Places; Owen Harris' dark comedy Kill Your Friends, based on the 2008 novel of the same name; and Equals, a dystopian, science-fiction romantic drama directed by Drake Doremusall of which were critical failures and rank among the lowest-grossing films of his career. Response to Hoult's performance in Equals was relatively better; Peter Travers called him and his co-star Kristen Stewart "quietly devastating", and Katie Walsh, writing for Los Angeles Times, said the duo were "finely matched both in their androgynous beauty and in their performances of a repressed humanity". Despite doubts about his contract with the franchise, Hoult returned for the 2016 film X-Men: Apocalypse. Upon release, the film became the third-ranked X-Men film in terms of worldwide box office collections, earning about $540million. It was also a top-grossing production outside the United States.

2017–present: Biographical and independent films
The action film Collide, which had Hoult star as a drug dealer, was released in the United States in February 2017 to a poor response from audiences and critics. The film garnered negative reviews; its dismal box office performance was attributed to poor marketing and multiple delays caused by the 2015 chapter 11 bankruptcy of its production company Relativity Media. Forbes Scott Mendelson analysed the film's failure and said Hoult did not necessarily have enough "star power" to draw audiences. He highlighted the misogyny and sense of entitlement in the entertainment industry, writing that director Eran Creevy and Hoult would get better offers despite the failure of films like Collide, as opposed to the women and other minority groups, who are either ignored or stereotyped. Responses to Hoult's next film, the romance drama Newness, were more enthusiastic. The production had its world premiere at the 2017 Sundance Film Festival; it stars Hoult as one half of a Los Angeles-based couple who meet through online dating and begin an open relationship. Drake Doremus, the film's director, said Hoult's role was unlike his previous work; "a very complex and emotionally mature performance that we haven't seen yet".

Hoult starred in a series of biographical and historical films in 2017; he said he preferred playing characters that might help him improve as an actor and that the "actors I look up to started doing their best work in their early 30s and I'll be hitting that age ... I'm just trying to learn". He portrayed American author J. D. Salinger in Danny Strong's Rebel in the Rye, which chronicles Salinger's life from his youth to the World War II era and the years preceding the publication of his debut novel, The Catcher in the Rye. Hoult auditioned for the role because he was intrigued by the film's script and Salinger's enigmatic personality; "I didn't know he fought in the second world war and landed on D-Day: ... had intermittent PTSD or that he became interested in Vedanta philosophy and meditated and did yoga." To prepare for the role, Hoult read The Catcher in the Rye and biographies about Salinger. Hoult said the biggest challenge was to get a real understanding of Salinger's character; "everyone has an idea of [Salinger] in their mind ... you're creating a character that people have very strong feelings about. You can't prove to be right or wrong through impressions." Rebel in the Rye opened to a poor response from film critics. Carson Lund of Slant was largely unimpressed by Hoult's "feeble" performance and his inability to "reinvest the character with the complexities lost in the story's programmatic telling". RogerEbert.com's Matt Fagerholm wrote that although Hoult was capable of illuminating the insecurities and fixations of his character, he is never "quite believable as Salinger". Fagerholm ascribed the failure to the script, which left the character's key motivations "frustratingly muddled".

Hoult co-starred in The Current War, a dramatisation of the feud between electrical pioneers Thomas Edison and George Westinghouse. Hoult was cast in the role of Nikola Tesla, for which he grew a moustache and attended science lessons about electromagnetism and dynamos. He lost weight for his role by following a strict diet. Response to The Current War was mixed; David Ehrlich of IndieWire described Hoult's performance as a tribute to David Bowie, who had previously played Tesla in The Prestige (2006). In a departure from biographical dramas, Hoult next starred as an American soldier in Sand Castle, a production he described as a very different war film "in terms of the pacing and the emotion ... very under the surface, that futility-of-war idea". He recalled the filming experience in the Jordanian military bases practising clearing procedures: "we put on these masks, get given these guns, are put inside this pitch-black house ... try and hunt down these bad guys hiding inside. You're in all the gear ... the adrenaline starts pumping." Released on Netflix in 2017, the film garnered mixed reviews.

In The Favourite (2018), a critically acclaimed period drama about Anne, Queen of Great Britain, Hoult played the supporting role of Robert Harley, 1st Earl of Oxford and Earl Mortimer. He next voiced Fiver in the animated television miniseries adaptation of Richard Adams' 1972 novel Watership Down. In 2019, Hoult portrayed author J. R. R. Tolkien in the biopic Tolkien. He next reprised his role as Hank McCoy in the X-Men film Dark Phoenix. Both Tolkien and Dark Phoenix were poorly received. 

The following year, Hoult began starring as Peter III of Russia in the Hulu comedy-drama series The Great. The series and his performance received critical acclaim. He was nominated for two Golden Globe Awards and a Primetime Emmy Award for Outstanding Lead Actor in a Comedy Series. In 2021, Hoult appeared in a villainous role in the thriller Those Who Wish Me Dead. Hoult starred in the black comedy film The Menu, alongside Ralph Fiennes and Anya Taylor-Joy, in 2022. It received positive reviews.

Hoult will next play the titular role in the comedy-horror film Renfield and will have a voice role in the animated film Garfield.

Personal life and other work

Hoult splits his time between London and Los Angeles. He is in a relationship with American model Bryana Holly. The couple have a son together.

During his childhood, Hoult played basketball for the Reading-based team Reading Rockets, which played in the English Basketball League. He was later appointed as the club's ambassador. He also follows Formula One racing and has attended several Grand Prix events at Montreal, Singapore and Germany.

Philanthropy
Hoult is a philanthropist and supports numerous charities; he has been associated with organisations that support children. He was appointed the first National Society for the Prevention of Cruelty to Children (NSPCC) Young Person Ambassador, for supporting the charity's activities aimed at children and young people. Since 2009, he has also been involved with the Teenage Cancer Trust; he continues to visit patients supported by the organisation and has helped promote its awareness campaigns, including the sun-safety campaign "Shunburn". Hoult designed sweaters for Save the Children's and Selfish Mother's joint Christmas Jumper Day campaign. He encouraged customers to buy the festive collection and support the charitable cause, which he thought would bring a "real change to children's lives". He also donated a pair of shoes, which was auctioned by Small Steps Project, an organisation that helps homeless and malnourished children. Hoult was inducted into the NSPCC Hall of Fame in 2010 for his contributions to the campaign against child cruelty.

Hoult visited Nairobi, Kenya, as a part of a Christian Aid project aimed at providing clean water and sanitation. During his stay he met local people and helped clean the locality. He said of his experience; "I met great people making the best of the situation ... it is heart-breaking in many ways to see the living conditions". He has also been associated with Jeans for Refugees, a project and fundraising initiative intended to help refugees around the world. He donated a signed pair of jeans to the organisation; profits from the campaign were donated to the refugee support agency International Rescue Committee.

Filmography and awards

For his role in About a Boy (2002), Hoult won the Best Youth Performance at the Phoenix Film Critics Society Awards and earned a nomination for Critics' Choice Movie Award for Best Young Performer. He was nominated for the BAFTA Rising Star Award for his role in A Single Man at the 2010 British Academy Film Awards. For his performance in The Great, he was nominated for the Primetime Emmy Award for Outstanding Lead Actor in a Comedy Series.

References

External links

 
 About a Boy interview with Hoult

1989 births
Living people
21st-century English male actors
Alumni of the Sylvia Young Theatre School
English expatriates in the United States
English male child actors
English male film actors
English male radio actors
English male stage actors
English male television actors
English male voice actors
Male actors from Berkshire
National Society for the Prevention of Cruelty to Children people
People educated at Ranelagh Grammar School
People educated at Sixth Form College, Farnborough
People from Wokingham